Joseph Douglas Moore (March 23, 1939 – February 3, 2016) was a Canadian politician. He served in the Legislative Assembly of New Brunswick from 1976 to 1987, as a Progressive Conservative member for the constituency of Victoria–Tobique.

References

1939 births
2016 deaths
Progressive Conservative Party of New Brunswick MLAs
People from New Glasgow, Nova Scotia